Garbology is the study of modern refuse and trash as well as the use of trash cans, compactors and various types of trash can liners. As an academic discipline it was pioneered at the University of Arizona and long directed by William Rathje. The project started in 1973, originating from an idea of two students for a class project. It is a major source of information on the nature and changing patterns in modern refuse, and thereby, human society.

Industries wishing to demonstrate that discards originating with their products are (or are not) important in the trash stream are avid followers of this research, as are municipalities wishing to learn whether some parts of the trash they collect has any salable value.

The studies of garbology and archaeology often overlap, because fossilized or otherwise time-modified trash preserved in middens is quite often the only remnant of ancient populations that can be found. For those who did not leave buildings, writing, tombs, trade goods, or pottery, refuse and trash are likely to be the only possible sources of information. In addition, ancient garbage sometimes contains information available in no other way, such as food remains, pollen traces of then local plants, and broken tools.

Garbology is also used as an overtechnical term for waste management, with refuse workers called garbologists, first seen in Australia in the 1960s.

History

University of Arizona

A. J. Weberman invented the word garbology in 1971 when he went through Bob Dylan's trash. William Rathje's start of his ecologically oriented garbology excavations began in 1987. Rathje was hoping to find more information regarding what the landfills contained as well as to examine how garbage reacts in its environment. During the time that Rathje was starting his projects many misconceptions began and the nation became more conscious of what they were throwing away. Many Americans started thinking the landfills were filled with their "most commonly used items"; fast food containers, disposable diapers, and Styrofoam. Rathje thinks this assumption derives from the fact that these items are often the most colorful and easy to spot. The industrial trash was not correctly accounted for before Rathje's project. According to charts before Rathje the amount of building material in the land fills was zero.

He started by surveying different areas of the country to better understand what types of garbage survives under different climates. He found there was little difference between the sites because the garbage is compacted. The California landfills did have less paper than those in Illinois. Recycling is thought to be the cause of the paper difference between states. Rathje's research uncovered some other misconceptions about landfills. In particular, it was revealed that the rate of natural biodegradation is far slower than had been assumed (e.g., in capacity planning). It was found that the plastic bottles that were crushed at the top were able to be re-inflated easier than those that were at the bottom because of a new system of bottle making called light-weighting. This is the process of using less plastic in bottles to conserve material and save money. Light-weighting is not limited to plastic alone; this process is used for aluminum and paper as well. Rathje also found that Americans were wrong about what they thought they threw away most. When combined, the three most infamous types of trash—diapers, fast food containers, and Styrofoam—amounted to less than three percent of the landfill's waste. Rathje found that plastic was 20-24 percent of waste and paper alone was 40 percent of the waste found in landfills. Thirteen percent of this paper waste was from newspapers. Rathje states the irony of this fact in his book. He talks about how newspapers are usually the ones that report things such as waste and pollution and it is these same newspapers clogging the landfills. Rathje discusses the rate of closing landfills and how for every six small landfills closed one large landfill opens. At the time he published his book he predicted that in the next five years 50 percent of the landfills open at the time would close. He determined this from his findings. In an effort for states to prevent their area becoming a large landfill often states ship their trash to other states. States such as Michigan are taking measures to prevent their state from being the landing spot for the nation's trash. Michigan has found that in the past years most of their rise in trash rates are because of trash imports from Canada.

Present-day studies
Garbology today is used to assess waste and figure out new ideas for waste management. Edward Humes estimated that the average US citizen produces 102 tons of refuse in their lifetime.

Scientists are currently studying the floating mass of plastic trash in the Pacific Ocean. This affected area is twice the size of Texas. The scientists study the effect of the trash on the marine life, and how to solve the rising problem. Another current study is the process of changing waste into energy. As both become a rising problem the methane in landfills has the potential to be used to generate small amounts of electricity.

Garbology is also what the community of Holden Village has called its communal sorting, separating, and disposal of landfill, recycling, and compostable items.  Holden Village is a ministry of the Lutheran Church in the Cascade Mountains of Washington and has utilized the term for over a decade.  It reflects both the community's commitment to sustainable practices and a care for creation.  Holden hires a full-time "Garbologist" who leads groups of community members in the sorting of the village waste.

Garbology as an approach has been practised by various fields like social sciences studies garbology how human have explored waste management and its various other uses while science uses waste management technologies. Different fields of study has explored the study of garbology and its uses. Garbology as an anthropology study has been proved very helpful in exploring the past and discovering ancient sites using the 'litters', telltale domestic items, legible newspapers made their task easier. Household garbage proved to be more helpful and it required a lot of fieldwork and physical labour. Garbology is not mathematics, one needs to dig it, feel it, sort it. to smell it.

Green cities
Portland, Oregon consistently rates at the top of every list of sustainability, green buildings, recycling rates, clean transportation, energy efficiency, and eco businesses. Portland is considering implementing anaerobic digesters and plasma gasification that would efficiently decompose garbage.

Copenhagen, Denmark is the most efficient city in the world with garbage. 3 to 4 percent of the city's waste ends up in landfills. When compared to the 69 percent of the US's average, this is a very small percentage. Trash is largely incinerated and in the process used to generate electricity. Six out of ten Danish homes are heated this way.

Investigative uses
Another use of garbology is as an investigative tool of law enforcement, corporate espionage, or other types of investigations. This not only includes physical sorting of papers from a rubbish bin but also analysis of files found in a computer's recycle bin. The FBI ran "trash covers" against various organizations deemed subversive in the early 1950s. The Trinity Foundation used such measures to demonstrate that the organization of the crooked televangelist Robert Tilton discarded prayer requests it received after removing the money inside. In some countries garbology is illegal unless it is being used by the country's intelligence services. However journalists continue to use it to investigate the stories they produce.

In the school system

Garbology has the potential to teach us more sustainable methods when it comes to managing our waste. Our lack of knowledge has resulted in many recyclable items being thrown out on a daily basis. This has negative effects on the environment and the health of the human population. Landfills continue to be filled up with unnecessary items that are taking up valuable space. In order to make a change, it is essential that we learn the necessary facts. In response, many schools have incorporated garbology into the curriculum. Not only have garbology studies been found in universities, but in primary and secondary schools as well. The general focus has been on the three concepts of reduce, reuse, and recycle.

The Lincoln Public Schools have made it a priority to teach their students the importance of garbology while making use of the previous three concepts. They have placed a particular focus on the younger grades, primarily grade two classes. Arlene Hanna, the extension associate and coordinator of enrichment programs in Lancaster County, states that the "students learn how to identify garbage as natural or manufactured, to describe how garbage impacts the environment and to describe ways to reduce, reuse and recycle." She later reveals that they have seen positive outcomes from parents such as "children checking the codes on plastic bottles at home." A large responsibility is put upon younger generations to make a change as they have the strongest potential for creating a better future. The lessons learned in garbology programs are essential in achieving sustainability. There is nothing more effective than "learning by doing."

Metro High School in Columbus, Ohio, is a secondary school which has been recognized for its garbology program. The most unusual aspect of this program is that it is intertwined between all of the student's courses and not just one in particular. Their program uses methods that include videos and graphing which the students then reflect on through assignments.

Through social media

Over the years, social media have become a leading source for information. Garbology Kids, a series of books written by Sabbithry Persad, has created a Facebook group and Twitter account focused on waste management.  The social media sites focus primarily on teaching kids lessons about sustainable waste methods by offering useful sources and activities. Many of the sources offer important information focusing on how to sort garbage, while the activities include crafts which use recycled materials.  Their main goal is to "offer fun and interesting way[s] to learn about waste generation and waste management for the earth and future".

See also
 Dump digging
 Dumpster diving
 Freeganism
 Historical digging
 Rescue archaeology, an archaeological survey and excavation carried out in areas threatened by construction or development

References

External links
"Following Garbage's Long Journey Around The Earth", radio interview with Edward Humes on Fresh Air (31 mins; 2012)
William Rathje is interviewed on the Television Program Creativity with Bill Moyers available on YouTube.

Waste management
Historical archaeology